Adam Robson (16 August 1928 – 15 March 2007) was a Scotland international rugby union player. He played as a flanker.

Rugby union career

Amateur career
He was playing for the Edinburgh College of Art. A relative Andrew Gordon suggested he play with Hawick Linden before trying to make the step up to Hawick.

Robson then played for Hawick Linden and Hawick.

Provincial career
He was capped by South of Scotland District in the 1954–55 Scottish Inter-District Championship.

International career

Administrative career
Robson served on the Barbarians committee for 20 years.

He became the 97th President of the Scottish Rugby Union. He served the standard one year from 1983 to 1984.

Outside of rugby union
He was a prolific artist selling more than 900 works; and also authored three books.

References

Sources

 Bath, Richard (ed.) The Complete Book of Rugby (Seven Oaks Ltd, 1997 )
 Bath, Richard (ed.) The Scotland Rugby Miscellany (Vision Sports Publishing Ltd, 2007 )
 Jones, J.R. Encyclopedia of Rugby Union Football (Robert Hale, London, 1976 )

1928 births
2007 deaths
Alumni of the Edinburgh College of Art
Hawick Linden RFC players
Hawick RFC players
Presidents of the Scottish Rugby Union
Rugby union players from Hawick
Scotland international rugby union players
Scottish rugby union players
South of Scotland District (rugby union) players
Rugby union flankers